The 2021 Big Ten Men's Lacrosse Tournament was held from May 1 to May 8. From this year, all six teams participate in the tournament while the top two teams in the regular season standings received first round byes. The first round matches were held on the campus of the higher seed teams, and the semifinals and final matches were held at the Panzer Stadium in University Park, Pennsylvania. The winner of the tournament received the Big Ten Conference's automatic bid to the 2021 NCAA Division I Men's Lacrosse Championship. The seeds were determined based on the teams' regular season conference record. Maryland won the tournament, beating Johns Hopkins 12–10.

Regular season standings
Penn State earned seed #3 via a head-to-head tiebreaker over Ohio State. Michigan and Johns Hopkins were tied after applying all tiebreaking procedures. Michigan earned seed #5 by coin flip.

Not including Big Ten Tournament and NCAA tournament results

Schedule

Bracket

Awards
 MVP: Jared Bernhardt, Maryland
 All-Tournament Team
 Garrett Degnon, Jr., M, Johns Hopkins
 Matt Narewski, Jr., FO, Johns Hopkins
 Jared Reinson, Sr., D, Johns Hopkins
 Jared Bernhardt, Sr., A, Maryland
 Anthony DeMaio, Sr., M, Maryland
 John Geppert, Jr., LSM, Maryland
 Nick Grill, Sr., D, Maryland
 Brett Makar, Jr., D, Maryland
 Josh Zawada, So., A, Michigan
 Brennan Kamish, Sr., SSDM, Rutgers

References

External links
 2021 Big Ten Men's Lacrosse Tournament
 Boxscore (final)
 Boxscore (Semifinal, Maryland vs Michigan)
 Boxscore (Semifinal, Johns Hopkins vs Rutgers)
 Boxscore (first round, Michigan vs Ohio State)
 Boxscore (first round, Johns Hopkins vs Penn State)

2021 NCAA Division I men's lacrosse season
Big Ten Conference Men's Lacrosse
Big Ten men's lacrosse tournament